Iain Bryden Percy  (born 21 March 1976) is an English sailor and double Olympic champion for Great Britain.

Olympics

Percy competed in the 2000 Summer Olympics in Sydney, where he won a gold medal in the Finn class. He memorably received his gold medal at a ceremony on the steps of the Sydney Opera House.

He competed in the 2004 Summer Olympics in Athens and finished 6th in the double-handed Star class with Steve Mitchell. The same team received a bronze medal at the 2005 World Championships and a gold medal at the 2005 European Championships.

Percy won World Bronze in the Star Class with Andrew Simpson in 2007 and European Championship Gold in 2009. The duo won Gold in the same class of boat at the 2010 World Championships which took place in Brazil. With previous partner, Steve Mitchell, Percy won the 2002 Star World Championships in Los Angeles, and medalled in the next three world championships, winning the bronze medal in each of them.

At the 2008 Olympics in Beijing he again won a gold medal, this time in the Star class, teaming up with Andrew Simpson.

At the 2012 Olympics in London he and Andrew Simpson won the silver medal, after a tight race against Swedish duo Fredrik Lööf and Max Salminen.

Percy is a member of Hayling Island Sailing Club and sails there regularly.

America's Cup
In 2005, Percy decided to take a break from full-time Olympic Class sailing and join America's Cup challenger +39 Challenge as helmsman. Due to limited funding, +39 only managed ninth place in the Louis Vuitton Cup. Iain then joined Great Britain's TEAMORIGIN competing in the Louis Vuitton Trophy regattas (Nice, Auckland, La Maddalena) and on the TP52 circuit, prior to stepping onboard Artemis Racing for the Louis Vuitton Trophy – Dubai.

Percy has been with Artemis Racing since then and was Sailing Team Director for the Challenger of Record for the 35th America's Cup. Since 2017 he has been CEO of Artemis Technologies.

Awards
Percy was appointed Member of the Order of the British Empire (MBE) in 2005, as a recognition of his Olympic gold medal. He was appointed Officer of the Order of the British Empire (OBE) in the 2009 New Year Honours.

References

External links

1976 births
Living people
Sportspeople from Southampton
English male sailors (sport)
People educated at Peter Symonds College
Sailors at the 2000 Summer Olympics – Finn
Sailors at the 2004 Summer Olympics – Star
Sailors at the 2008 Summer Olympics – Star
Sailors at the 2012 Summer Olympics – Star
Olympic sailors of Great Britain
English Olympic medallists
Olympic gold medallists for Great Britain
Officers of the Order of the British Empire
Olympic medalists in sailing
Artemis Racing sailors
Olympic silver medallists for Great Britain
Medalists at the 2012 Summer Olympics
Medalists at the 2008 Summer Olympics
Medalists at the 2000 Summer Olympics
2007 America's Cup sailors
2017 America's Cup sailors
2013 America's Cup sailors
Star class world champions
Farr 40 class world champions
World champions in sailing for Great Britain